Hance House may refer to:

Hance House (Olivet, Michigan)
Hance House and Barn, East Bradford Township, Pennsylvania
Hill–Hance House, Chestnut Hill, Tennessee